= K. Bhavaneeswari =

Indian police officer from Tamilnadu

- Known for: 2002 Batch Director General of Police of Tamil Nadu Police in India

K Bhavaneeswari IPS, known as K Bhavaneeswari IPS, is the former Director General of Police of Tamil Nadu. Currently Transferred as IGP- West Zone, Coimbatore. Ms K Bhavaneeswari IPS (Tamil Nadu 2002) presently IGP/ Joint Director, Vigilance & Anti-Corruption, Chennai, has been transferred and posted as IGP, West Zone, Coimbatore.

== Achievements ==
Bhavanee's contributions to law enforcement were recognized with numerous awards, including the President's Police Medal for Distinguished Service. the Indian Police Medal for Distinguished Service.

Twenty-one police officers hailing from Tamil Nadu have been chosen to receive medals bestowed by the Centre in celebration of Independence Day. As per an announcement from the Director-General of Police's office, these officers have been honored with the prestigious President's Police Medal for Distinguished Service. Among them is K. Bhavaneeswari, Inspector-General of Police for the West Zone in Coimbatore.

Amidst the ongoing battle against the COVID-19 pandemic, the Tamil Nadu government has taken a decisive step by appointing a special nodal officer to oversee coronavirus-related issues. K. Bhavanesswari, an IPS officer, has been entrusted with the crucial responsibility of coordinating efforts to combat the spread of the virus and mitigate its impact on the state's populace. As the designated officer for COVID-19 issues, K. Bhavanesswari will play a pivotal role in orchestrating the state's response to the pandemic. Her duties include coordinating with various government departments, healthcare institutions, and other stakeholders to ensure a cohesive and effective approach towards controlling the spread of the virus. She will also oversee the implementation of preventive measures, vaccination drives, and strategies for managing healthcare infrastructure amid the surge in cases.

== Career highlights ==
Bhavaneeswari's notable assignments include:

- Superintendent of Police, Kanyakumari District: In this role, she was responsible for maintaining law and order, crime prevention, and overseeing police operations in the district.
- Deputy Commissioner of Kilpauk Range: She managed police operations and administration in the Kilpauk range, focusing on public safety and crime control.
- Joint Commissioner of Traffic, Chennai: As the Joint Commissioner, she implemented and monitored traffic management strategies to improve road safety and reduce traffic congestion in Chennai.
- Deputy Inspector General of Police, Trichy Range: In this capacity, she oversaw police activities in the Trichy range, ensuring effective law enforcement and community policing.
- Inspector General of Vigilance and Anti-Corruption Wing: Following her promotion to IG, Bhavaneeswari was posted in the Vigilance and Anti-Corruption Wing, where she led efforts to combat corruption and promote transparency in public services.
- Inspector General of Police: Currently, she is working as the Inspector General of Police (IGP) for the West Zone in Coimbatore.
